Westwood High School is a 4-year public high school in the western part of Mesa, Arizona, United States under the jurisdiction of Mesa Public Schools. It was opened in 1962 with Elias Brimhall as the founding principal. In the 1983–84 school year, it was honored as a Blue Ribbon school.
In 2018 it was reclassified as a "A" school through the Arizona Department of Education school accountability system.

Demographics
During the 2020-2021 school year, the demographic break of the 3,355 students enrolled was:
 Male – 50.8%
 Female – 49.2%
 Native American/Alaskan – 11.9%
 Asian/Pacific Islander – 2.3%
 Black – 6.2%
 Hispanic – 56.4%
 White – 21.3%
 Multiracial – 1.9%

Athletics 
Offered Athletics:

 Badminton
 Cross Country
 Football
 Pom & Cheer
 B/G Golf
 Swim & Dive
 B/G Volleyball
 B/G Basketball
 B/G Soccer
 Wrestling
 E-Sports
 Baseball
 Softball
 Track & Field
 B/G Tennis

Feeder schools 
Junior High Schools that feed into Westwood High School (and the Elementary Schools that feed into the junior high schools):

Carson Junior High:

 Adams Elementary School
 Eisenhower Center for Innovation
 Ralph Waldo Emerson Elementary School
 Lehi Elementary School
 Roosevelt Elementary School
 Webster Elementary School
 Whitman Elementary School
 Whittier Elementary School

Kino Junior High:

 Eisenhower Center for Innovation
 Lehi Elementary School
 Edison Elementary School
 Holmes Elementary School
 Kerr Elementary School
 Lincoln Elementary School
 Lowell Elementary School

Rhodes Junior High:

 Crismon Elementary School
 Pedro Guerrero Elementary School
 Lincoln Elementary School
 Redbird Elementary School
 Roosevelt Elementary School
 Summit Academy (IB)

Stapley Junior High

 Barbara Bush Elementary School
 Marjorie Entz Elementary School
 Nathan Hale Elementary School
 Hermosa Vista Elementary School
 Zedo Ishikawa Elementary School
 Lehi Elementary School
 Douglas MacArthur Elementary School

Notable alumni
Individuals 

 Randy Bennett, basketball head coach at St. Mary's College
 Rick Burch, bassist of Jimmy Eat World
 Siaha Burley, wide receiver in Arena Football League
 Troy Kotsur, actor
 Tom Linton, guitarist of Jimmy Eat World
 Albie Lopez, former MLB player (Cleveland Indians, Tampa Bay Rays, Arizona Diamondbacks, Atlanta Braves, Kansas City Royals)
 Alex Madrid, former MLB player (Milwaukee Brewers, Philadelphia Phillies)
 Ritchie McKay, basketball head coach at Liberty University
 Larry Owens, NBA basketball player with Washington Wizards
 Scott Smith, mayor of Mesa
 Danny White, coach in Arena Football League, former quarterback for Dallas Cowboys

Groups
 Founding members of Authority Zero, a punk rock band

References

High schools in Mesa, Arizona
Educational institutions established in 1962
1962 establishments in Arizona
Public high schools in Arizona
International Baccalaureate schools in Arizona